Robert Cadzow "Roy" Calder (12 March 1904 − 1 July 1976) was a New Zealand diver who represented his country at the 1930 British Empire Games in Hamilton, Ontario. He was hampered by a back injury at the games and was forced to withdraw from the high dive, but finished fourth in the springboard competition.

He won the New Zealand diving championship every year except 1931 between 1926 and 1933.

Calder died in 1976 and was buried in Andersons Bay Cemetery, Dunedin.

References

1904 births
1976 deaths
People from Lawrence, New Zealand
New Zealand male divers
Commonwealth Games competitors for New Zealand
Divers at the 1930 British Empire Games
Burials at Andersons Bay Cemetery
20th-century New Zealand people